Domscheit-Berg is a German surname. Notable people with the surname include:

 Anke Domscheit-Berg (born 1968), German politician and activist
 Daniel Domscheit-Berg (born 1978), German technology activist

Compound surnames
German-language surnames